Voyage(s) or The Voyage may refer to:

Literature 
Voyage : A Novel of 1896, Sterling Hayden
 Voyage (novel), a 1996 science fiction novel by Stephen Baxter
The Voyage,  Murray Bail
 "The Voyage" (short story), a 1921 story by Katherine Mansfield
 "Voyage", a poem by Patti Smith from her 1996 book The Coral Sea
 Voyages (poem), a 1926 poem by Hart Crane
Le Voyage,  1996 graphic novel, see Edmond Baudoin
Le Voyage, poem by Baudelaire

Film and television 
 The Voyage (1921 film), an Italian silent drama film
 The Voyage (1974 film), an Italian film
 Voyage (2013 film), a Hong Kong film made mostly in English
 Voyages (film), a 1999 film directed by Emmanuel Finkiel
 Voyage (1993 film), a 1993 American TV film directed by John Mackenzie
 Voyage.tv, an American online travel channel
 Voyages Television, an international travel marketing channel
 Voyage (French TV channel), a television channel in France operated by Pathé

Music 
 Voyage (band), a 1977–1982 French disco group
 Voyage (rapper), Mihajlo Veruović (born 2001), Serbian rapper
 ABBA Voyage, a 2022–2023 virtual concert residency in London by ABBA

Classical music
 The Voyage (opera), a 1992 opera by Philip Glass
 "Voyage", a 1948 song by Francis Poulenc
 Le Voyage, a 1967 ballet by Pierre Henry

Albums 
 Voyage (ABBA album), 2021
 Voyage (Chick Corea album), 1984
 Voyage (Christy Moore album) or the title song, "The Voyage" (see below), 1989
 Voyage (David Crosby album), 2006
 Voyage (The Sound of Arrows album), 2011
 Voyage (Stan Getz album) or the title song, 1986
 Voyage (Voyage album), 1977
 The Voyage (album), by Johnny Duhan, or the title song, 2005
 The Voyage, by Haywyre 2012
 Voyage (EP), by In Fear and Faith, 2007
 Le Voyage, by Paul Motian, or the title song, 1979
 Voyages, by Jesus Jones, 2018

Songs 
 "The Voyage" (song), an Irish modern folk classic written by Johnny Duhan, popularized by Christy Moore, 1989
 "Voyage" (Ayumi Hamasaki song), 2002
 "The Voyage", by the Moody Blues from On the Threshold of a Dream, 1969
 "Voyage, voyage", by Desireless, 1986

Other uses 
 The Voyage (roller coaster), a roller coaster at Holiday World & Splashin' Safari in Santa Claus, Indiana, United States
 Voyage: Inspired by Jules Verne, a 2005 PC game
 Voyage 200, a calculator from Texas Instruments
 Voyages Hotels & Resorts, an Australian company
 Voyages-sncf.com, a travel agency website
 Volkswagen Voyage, a sedan variant of the Volkswagen Gol automobile

See also 
 
 Exploration
 Journey (disambiguation)
 Travel
 Trip (disambiguation)
 Voyager (disambiguation)
 Voyageur (disambiguation)
 Wikivoyage